Noyal-Pontivy is a commune in the Morbihan department of Brittany in north-western France. Inhabitants of Noyal-Pontivy are called in French Noyalais.

Breton language
The municipality launched a linguistic plan through Ya d'ar brezhoneg on 19 September 2005.

See also
Communes of the Morbihan department
Gaston-Auguste Schweitzer Sculptor of Noyal-Pontivy war memorial

References

External links

Official website 

 Mayors of Morbihan Association 

Communes of Morbihan